The state highways in Montana are the state highways owned and maintained by the Montana Department of Transportation (MDT) in the US state of Montana.

Montana's state highways are classified as either primary or secondary. Several of Montana's state highways (both primary and secondary), or sections thereof, have also been designated as part of the National Highway System.


Primary state highways
The square markers used today to identify primary Montana highways are only slightly different from their 1940s and earlier predecessors. The old markers used the word "ROUTE" above the number in big size, the route number in the middle, and the word "MONTANA" from edge-to-edge at the sign bottom. The font used was similar to that used for US routes.

Special routes

Secondary state highways

Montana's secondary system was established in 1942, but secondary highways (S routes) were not signed until the 1960s. S route designations first appeared on the state highway map in 1960 and are abbreviated as "S-nnn". Route numbers 201 and higher are, with very few exceptions, exclusively reserved for S routes. Notable exceptions include, MT 287, and the former MT 789.

The highway markers for Montana's Secondary Highways are distinctive in that the route number appears in black on a white down-pointing arrowhead. (Early markers were white numbers on black arrowheads with the word Montana in the flat top of the inverted arrowhead and Secondary appearing below the route number on the shields.)

See also

References

External links

 
State